The government of Trinidad and Tobago officially recognizes a number of holidays and celebrations from most represented groups. The following holidays are those that are officially observed in Trinidad and Tobago:

Public Holidays

Carnival Dates 
The table shows a list of Trinidad and Tobago Carnival dates from 2009 to 2020.

Other Holidays

 Muslim schools get a day off on Eid-al-Adha every year and some businesses close on this day.
 On the 13th of October 2017, the government declared this day a public holiday (First Peoples' Day) but was only declared a public holiday for the year 2017 only.

References

See also

 
Trinidad and Tobago
Society of Trinidad and Tobago
Trinidad and Tobago culture
Events in Trinidad and Tobago